90's House is an American reality television series broadcast on MTV before being moved to MTV2 due to low ratings. The show aired for eight episodes from September 26 to November 17, 2017. The show featured 12 "millennial" housemates living in a house set in the 1990s while participating in various 1990s-themed challenges. The winner received $90,000, a Mazda Miata and tickets for two on board the Ship-Hop I Love the 90s Cruise.

Each episode had a challenge called, "Who Got Game," and sometimes a mini challenge, which provided an advantage in the "Who Got Game," challenge. At the end of each episode contestants were either "Chillin'" being safe or "Illin'" being risked for elimination and had to step onto the bounce pad.

Contestants
 Chase
 Devin
 Jenielle
 Lexus
 Mark
 Patrick
 Prince
 Sha-Monique
 Shannon
 Sierra
 Travana
 William

Episodes

Predecessor
This show is based on MTV's The 70s House, which aired in 2005 and focused on the culture of the 1970s.

References

Results 

2017 American television series debuts
2017 American television series endings
2010s American reality television series
MTV reality television series